Kozhushkino is a rural locality (a selo) in Novokvasnikovskoye Rural Settlement, Staropoltavsky District, Volgograd Oblast, Russia. The population was 56 as of 2010.

Geography 
Kozhushkino is located on the right bank of the Yeruslan River, 6 km north of Staraya Poltavka (the district's administrative centre) by road. Verkhny Yeruslan is the nearest rural locality.

References 

Rural localities in Staropoltavsky District